Esben Ullbæk Bundgaard-Jørgensen Selvig, stage name Dansken (born 17 June 1978) is a Norwegian-Danish rapper and singer.

His nickname, "The Dane", stems from his being born in Denmark, but moving to Norway as a child.

Selvig is best known as a singer in Yoga Fire  and rapper in Klovner I Kamp, in both bands together with Aslak "Alis" Hartberg. Klovner i Kamp won the Spellemannprisen for hip hop in 2001, and the Edvard Prize in 2002 for the song lyrics «Nattens sønner».

He has also written for the talkshow Torsdagsklubben. In 2011 he hosted the show Dansken & Fingern together with Klovner I Kamp's DJ, Thomas "Fingern" Gullestad, and won a Gullruten award. In 2013 he was a judge on Idol (season 7).

He married in 2012, and has one son.

References 

1978 births
Living people
Danish emigrants to Norway
Musicians from Oslo
20th-century Norwegian male singers
20th-century Norwegian singers
21st-century Norwegian male singers
21st-century Norwegian singers
Norwegian jazz singers
Norwegian rappers
Danish jazz singers
Danish rappers